The Mauritius Police Force (MPF) is the national law enforcement agency of Mauritius. The MPF carries out police, security and military functions on the island nation, with about 12,500 police officers under the command of the Commissioner of Police and is part of the Home Affairs Division which operates under the aegis of the Prime Minister's Office.

Military advisers from India and the United Kingdom work with the Special Mobile Force, the National Coast Guard, and the Police Helicopter Squadron, and Mauritian police officers are trained in India, the United Kingdom, and France. India and the United States provide training to National Coast Guard officers in such fields as seamanship and maritime law enforcement.

Branches

Anti Drug and Smuggling Unit
The Anti Drug and Smuggling Unit (ADSU) is the branch of the MPF which ensures the legal repression of drugs proliferation in Mauritius and the Outer Islands.

Anti Robbery Squad
In 2015 then commissioner of police (CP) Mario Nobin instigated the Anti Robbery Squad (ARS) which replaced the defunct Rottweilers SSU. CP Nobin appointed Inspector Seewoo to head the ARS in 2017. But Seewoo's promotion to Chief Inspector raised concerns amongst his colleagues. By 2020 the new commissioner of police Servansingh transferred Seewoo to Pointe-aux-Cannonniers before dismantling the ARS.

National Coast Guard
The National Coast Guard (NCG) is a branch of the MPF that was established in 1988 and consists of No. 1 Patrol Vessel Squadron and the Maritime Air Squadron.

The NCG has been modernising its fleet introducing a Kora-class Offshore Patrol Vessel CGS Barracuda in 2015, two Sarojini Naidu-class patrol vessels CGS Victory in 2016 and CGS Valiant in 2017 and ten 14.5m GSL Fast Interceptor Boats in 2016.

The Maritime Air Squadron (MAS) was established in 1990 and operates a fixed wing fleet of three HAL Dornier 228 and one Britten-Norman Defender BN-2T for search-and-rescue missions and surveillance of territorial waters. The Defender entered service in 1992, the first Dornier 228 entered service in 1990, the second in 2004 and third in 2016. The Do 288 can be fitted with 7.62mm gun pods.

The NCG has a maritime tactical unit established in 2010 the Commando Unit or Commandos Special Force. The Commando Unit trains with the Indian Navy's MARCOS and with the French Army 2nd Marine Infantry Parachute Regiment (2e RPIMa) based in Réunion part of FAZSOI.

Vessels

Aircraft

In March 1990 one radar equipped HAL Dornier 228 was ordered from India to form a maritime surveillance element by July 1991. This aircraft was reinforced in 1992 by a single twin turbo prop BN-2T Maritime Defender for coastal patrol work. A second HAL Dornier 228 was added to the fleet in 2004 and a third in 2016.

National Security Service
The National Security Service (NSS) is the branch of the MPF which handles matters of national security. It was formerly known as National Intelligence Unit (NIU) and State Security Service (SSS). During British rule it was known as Special Branch.

Police Helicopter Squadron

The Police Helicopter Squadron (PHS) is a branch of the MPF that was established in 1974 and its main roles are search and rescue and casualty evacuation both inland and at sea; combatting gandia cultivation; traffic patrol and escort of convoys; and VIP transport.

The helicopter fleet consists of four HAL Chetak, one Eurocopter Fennec AS555 and Two HAL Dhruv. The Dhruv helicopter entered service in 2009 followed by MK.3 variant in 2023. Two refurbished Chetak helicopters were gifted by India in 2016.

Special Mobile Force

Mauritius does not have a standing army; the Special Mobile Force (SMF) a branch of the MPF, is a paramilitary force established in 1960 following the withdrawal of two companies of the British East African land forces. The SMF recruited World War II veterans and select police officers and was commanded by British commanders until 1978.

The 1,500-member Special Mobile Force (SMF) and the 500-member National Coast Guard are the only two paramilitary units in Mauritius. Both units are composed of police officers on lengthy rotations to those services.

The SMF is a motorized infantry battalion with five companies, an engineering squadron, and a mobile wing comprising two squadrons equipped with armored vehicles. The SMF training is based on conventional military tactics focused on internal security. It engages extensively in civic works projects.

The SMF has a police tactical unit established in 1979, the Groupement d’Intervention de la Police Mauricienne (GIPM). The GIPM trains with the French National Gendarmerie police tactical unit Groupe d'intervention de la Gendarmerie nationale (GIGN) and the French Army 2e RPIMa.

Special Support Unit
The Special Support Unit (SSU), a branch of the MPF, is a police riot unit that was established in 1986. The SSU consists of five operational units and a training wing.

Police Band
The police band of the MPF is the official music unit of the service. It can operate as a military band, a marching band, a string orchestra as well as contemporary pop group. One of its alumni was Joseph Philippe Gentil, a composer best known for composing The Motherland, the National Anthem. On Independence Day (12 March) in 1968, a national newspaper mistakenly published the name and photograph of Philippe Oh San (the Police Band's maestro at the time) as the anthem's composer, with the remaining newspapers being reprinted with the correction.

Ranks

Small arms

See also
GRSE Mauritius offshore patrol vessel
Mandovi Marine (15 Meter) Class Patrol Craft
Praga Class Patrol Boat

References

External links
Mauritius Police Force website
Uniform Insignia Mauritius Police Force

Law enforcement in Mauritius
Mauritius